Painavu is the administrative headquarters of Idukki district of Kerala, India.

Transport
 Nearest Airport: Cochin International Airport, Nedumbassery - 120 km
 Nearest Railhead: Angamaly - 114 km
 Road connectivity: State Highway 33 km from Thodupuzha and Idukki Road from Neriyamangalam

Climate
 May - October : Rainy 12-25 degrees
 November - January : Mild 5-20 degrees
 February - April: Warm 15-30 degrees

Places of interest
Situated amidst the Idukki Wild Life Sanctuary, Painavu is also home to several State Government institutions such as Civil Station, Idukki and Government Engineering College, Idukki, Ekalavya Model Residential School idukki, District Panchayath idukki, Kendriya Vidyalaya Idukki, Model Polytechnic College Painavu. The Idukki Dam and the Cheruthoni Dam part of the Idukki Hydro Electric project are situated 7 km from Painavu.

External links 

Cities and towns in Idukki district